A list is any set of items. List or lists may also refer to:

People 
 List (surname)

Organizations 
 List College, an undergraduate division of the Jewish Theological Seminary of America
 SC Germania List, German rugby union club

Other uses 
 Angle of list, the leaning to either port or starboard of a ship
 List (information), an ordered collection of pieces of information
 List (abstract data type), a method to organize data in computer science
 List on Sylt, previously called List, the northernmost village in Germany, on the island of Sylt
 List, an alternative term for roll in flight dynamics
 To list a building, etc., in the UK it means to designate it a listed building that may not be altered without permission
 Lists (jousting), the barriers used to designate the tournament area where medieval knights jousted
 The Book of Lists, an American series of books with unusual lists

See also 

 The List (disambiguation)
 Listing (disambiguation)
 
 Liszt (disambiguation)
 LST (disambiguation)